Bernard Gallagher (26 September 1929 – 27 November 2016) was an English actor known for his stage work, including with the National Theatre and the Royal Court; and his many appearances in television soap operas and dramas. He was born in Bradford, West Riding of Yorkshire.

Gallagher studied English at Sheffield University, and following National service in the RAF Educational Service (1952–54), made his stage debut in Lyme Regis in 1956. Working in regional rep for the next decade, in 1965 he joined London’s Royal Court for Bill Gaskill’s first season, with roles in (amongst others) the original stage productions of Edward Bond’s Saved, and Joe Orton's The Ruffian on the Stair and The Erpingham Camp (both 1967). 

Later in 1967, Gallagher began a long association with the National Theatre (1967-1976), when he appeared in Clifford Williams’ all-male As You Like It. Other roles included in Howard Brenton’s Weapons of Happiness and Tom Stoppard’s Jumpers.

He also spent two seasons with the Royal Shakespeare Company, and worked for many other theatre companies, such as Paines Plough and Max Stafford-Clark's Out of Joint.
 

West End appearances included Michael Frayn’s Alphabetical Order (May Fair Theatre, 1975), Willy Russell’s Breezeblock Park (Whitehall Theatre, 1977) and Caryl Churchill’s Heart’s Desire (Duke of York's Theatre, 1997).

Gallagher played the lead role of compassionate consultant Ewart Plimmer in the first three years of BBC TV's long-running medical drama series Casualty.  In Granada Television’s daytime legal drama series Crown Court, he played Barrister Jonathan Fry QC.

Gallagher's numerous other TV credits include that of a Desk Sergeant in the second episode of the hard-hitting 1970s British police drama   The Sweeney (episode entitled:  Jackpot), Heartbeat (playing recurring character Graham Weston in series 6 and 7) and its sister programme The Royal (although he played different characters), Bergerac, Bad Girls, Wycliffe, Midsomer Murders and London's Burning.

In rare comedic roles he played Mervyn, the Holiday Camp manager in Selwyn, DS Lang in the "Photographs" episode of Some Mothers Do 'Ave 'Em and Mr. Glockenspiel in the "Alternative Culture" episode of The Thin Blue Line.

Gallagher also portrayed keen gardener Bill Molesley in ITV's Downton Abbey (2010-2013); and Enfield in The Duchess of Duke Street (series 2, episode 12).

Selected acting credits

References

External links

Bernard Gallagher at the British Film Institute

Male actors from Bradford
English male actors
English male stage actors
English male television actors
English people of Irish descent
1929 births
2016 deaths
Deaths from pneumonia in England